The Sisterhood of the Traveling Pants is a young adult novel by Ann Brashares published in 2001. It follows the adventures of four best friends — Lena Kaligaris, Tibby Rollins, Bridget Vreeland, and Carmen Lowell, who will be spending their first summer apart when a magical pair of jeans comes into their lives, turning their summer upside down. The book was adapted into a film of the same name in 2005. Four sequels to the book have been published, The Second Summer of the Sisterhood; Girls in Pants: The Third Summer of the Sisterhood; Forever in Blue: The Fourth Summer of the Sisterhood; and Sisterhood Everlasting.

Plot summary
In the first novel of the series, the reader is introduced to four high school students: Lena Kaligaris, Tibby Rollins, Bridget Vreeland, and Carmen Lowell. They have been best friends since birth (their mothers attended prenatal exercise classes together). The summer before their junior year of high school, Carmen finds a pair of old jeans that mysteriously fits each girl perfectly, despite their different sizes. This leads them to believe that the pants are magical. They share the "traveling pants" among themselves over the summer while they are separated.

Lena spends the summer with her grandparents in Santorini. During her stay, her grandmother attempts to set her up with a man by the name of Kostos. Kostos takes interest in Lena, who eventually returns the notion. She goes skinny-dipping and Kostos accidentally sees her. A misunderstanding leads Lena's grandparents to believe that Kostos attempted to assault Lena, causing an argument between the two families. Later in the summer, Lena explains to her grandparents what happened in order to repair the rift between her and Kostos' grandparents, and confesses to Kostos that she loves him.

Tibby spends the summer working at a Wallman's store, planning to film a documentary of her experiences. She meets a 12-year-old girl, Bailey, after the latter faints at the store; it is revealed that she has been diagnosed with leukemia. Over the course of the summer, the two become close friends and Bailey begins to help Tibby film her documentary. Bailey dies from her leukemia, which leads Tibby to refocus her documentary to capture the memories that they created together.

Carmen goes to South Carolina to spend the summer with her father, from whom she has grown apart since he and Carmen's mother divorced several years before.  Carmen learns that he is engaged. Out of frustration at feeling left out of her father's new family, she breaks a window in their home with a rock and returns home to her mother. She eventually attends her father's wedding and reconciles with her father and his new family.

Bridget attends a soccer camp in Baja California. While there, she falls for one of the coaches, Eric Richman. Bridget pursues him in spite of the camp's prohibition on coaches and campers entering relationships with each other, and eventually sees him in his underwear. She conspires to lose her virginity to him, until Eric eventually tells her that he does not feel as if he can worship her as she deserves. Lena comes to comfort a depressed Bridget and ends up taking her home.

Ann Brashares got the idea for the novel while working as an editor when colleague Jodi Anderson, proposed the concept of a group of girlfriends who share a pair of jeans. This was based on some of Anderson's own college experiences. Brashares decided to write the book herself. Anderson was compensated with a small bonus and a promotion. Brashares later said, "I loved the idea. A shirt can more easily fit different people, but jeans are more judgmental. It totally captured my fancy."

Themes

The Importance of Friendship

As the girls face challenges and different personal issues, they rely increasingly upon each other to cope with the changes. Their friendship helps them understand their identities more deeply. The pants are indeed a symbol of the girls' unique bond.

The Search for Love

The novel describes love in various forms - self-love, friendship, family bonds, etc. - and proclaims that all forms of love must come naturally and be respected.

The Importance of Family

In the novel, the family is portrayed as being rooted in one's birth yet dynamic, and also as existing between friendships in addition to blood relatives.

Coming of Age

This summer happens to be a wake-up call for each character. The girls are expected to make decisions for themselves and behave as responsible adults, as well as to figure out how to overcome obstacles and take risks.

Critical reception
Sisterhood was well-reviewed at the time of its release. USA Today's Deidre Donahue said Sisterhood "has resonated far more deeply than any of the grown-up novels I've read this year."  Linda Bindner of the School Library Journal called it "a complex book about a solid group of friends, with each one a strong and courageous individual in her own right." Publishers Weekly described it as "an outstanding and vivid book that will stay with readers for a long time."

Sisterhood became a New York Times bestseller, was named an ALA Best Books for Young Adults, won a Book Sense Book of the Year, and was named a Publishers Weekly Flying Start. The book received positive reviews from The Bulletin, and Seventeen, as well as starred reviews from Publishers Weekly and Kirkus Reviews.

Awards

References

2001 American novels
American novels adapted into films
American young adult novels
Delacorte Press books